Yasser (also spelled Yaser, Yasir, or Yassir; , Yāsir) is an Arabic male name.

Notable people with this given name
 Yasir ibn Amir (died 615 C.E.) is known in the Islamic traditions as the second person in history to be martyred for having adopted the faith of Islam. 
Yaser Abdel Said (born 1957), Egyptian fugitive wanted for the murder of his two daughters
 Yassir Abdul-Mohsen, Iraqi footballer
 Yaser Salem Ali, Emirati footballer
 Yasser Arafat (1929–2004), Palestinian leader
 Yasir Arafat (disambiguation), multiple people
 Yasser al-Azma, Syrian writer and actor
 Yasser Al-Baadani (born 1986), Yemeni football defender
 Yasser Al Borhamy (born 1958), Egyptian Muslim activist
 Yasser Ibrahim Farag (born 1984), Egyptian shot putter
 Yasser Al-Habib, Shia Muslim Scholar and founder of Fadak TV
 Yasser el Halaby, Egyptian squash player
 Yaser Kasim, Iraqi footballer
 Yasser Khalil (born 1972), Egyptian journalist
 Yasser Al Mosailem (born 1984), Saudi Arabian professional football player
 Yasser Portuondo (born 1983), Cuban volleyball player 
 Yasir Qadhi, American Islamic Scholar of Pakistani origin
 Yasser Al-Qahtani (born 1982), Saudi Arabian professional football player
 Yassir Raad, Iraqi footballer
 Yasser Abd Rabbo (born 1944), Palestinian politician
 Yasser Hashemi Rafsanjani (born 1971), Iranian politician
 Yasser Seirawan (born 1960), American chess player
 Yasir Shah (born 1986), Pakistani cricketer
 Yaser Shigan, Syrian boxer
 Yassir al-Sirri, Egyptian militant
 Yaser Yıldız, Turkish footballer
 Yasser Talal Al Zahrani (1984–2006), Saudi Arabian extra-judicial prisoner of the United States

Notable people with this surname
 Ammar ibn Yasir, one of the companions of the Islamic prophet Muhammad
 Hussein Yasser (born 1984), Egyptian-Qatari footballer
 Ramadan Yasser (born 1980), Egyptian boxer

Arabic-language surnames
Arabic masculine given names
Turkish masculine given names
Masculine given names
Pakistani masculine given names
Urdu-language surnames